James Cowden (born 1869) was a Southern Rhodesian politician who acted as Mayor of Bulawayo for four consecutive terms during the early 20th century. Born and educated in New South Wales, he moved to Johannesburg in 1896 and to Rhodesia the following year. He married Mary Ann (née Jones) in 1899, and had seven children. On 5 March 1920 he welcomed the first aircraft to land in Southern Rhodesia. A member of the Rhodesia Party, he served in the Southern Rhodesian Legislative Council as the member for Bulawayo Central from 1924 to 1939.

See also
 List of mayors of Bulawayo

References

Australian emigrants to Rhodesia
Rhodesian politicians
People from Bulawayo
1869 births
Year of death missing
Australian emigrants to South Africa
South African emigrants to Rhodesia
Mayors of Bulawayo
White Rhodesian people
Rhodesia Party politicians
Members of the Legislative Assembly of Southern Rhodesia